Parliamentary elections were held in Slovakia on 5 and 6 June 1992 alongside federal elections. The Movement for a Democratic Slovakia emerged as the largest party, winning 74 of the 150 seats in the National Council and forming a minority government under Vladimír Mečiar. The threshold had been raised from 3% (for the Slovak parliamentary election in 1990) to 5%.

In 1993, the Slovak National Party joined the government led by Prime Minister Mečiar. After a number of MPs left both parties of the ruling coalition, the Mečiar cabinet was brought down by a vote of non-confidence in March 1994. A coalition led by Jozef Moravčík, the former Czechoslovak and Slovak Foreign Minister, led the country to early elections.

Contesting parties

Results

External links
1992 Elections Statistical Office of Slovakia

Parliamentary elections in Slovakia
Slovakia
1992 in Slovakia
Legislative elections in Czechoslovakia
June 1992 events in Europe